The North Pacific crestfish or unicornfish (Lophotus capellei) is a crestfish of the genus Lophotus, found in the tropical and subtropical waters of the Pacific and Atlantic oceans, in a depth of 0–100 m.  Its length is up to 2 m.

References 

 
 Tony Ayling & Geoffrey Cox, Collins Guide to the Sea Fishes of New Zealand,  (William Collins Publishers Ltd, Auckland, New Zealand 1982) 

Lophotidae
Fish described in 1845